The Somali National Association of the Deaf (SONAD) is the national association for deaf people in Somalia, founded in April 2007. SONAD's mission is to ensure that deaf people in Somalia have rights like any other Somali citizen. This organization works to promote Somali Sign Language, deaf education, and human rights.

SONAD's headquarters is in Mogadishu, Somalia. SONAD is also a member of the World Federation of the Deaf.

References

External links
 SONAD in Gallaudet University World Deaf Information Resource

Deafness organizations
Disability organisations based in Somalia
Deaf culture in Somalia